Dwane Marshall Weir II (born July 12, 1990) is an American hip hop/R&B producer and songwriter, professionally known as Key Wane. Wane has produced for artists such as Big Sean, Jazmine Sullivan, Beyoncé, Drake, Jhene Aiko, Wale, Lil Wayne, Young Jeezy, Juicy J, Ariana Grande, Logic, Ty Dolla Sign and Meek Mill among others. He is best known for producing Drake's "All Me", Beyoncé's "Partition", Jazmine Sullivan's "Let It Burn" & "Insecure", Meek Mill's "Amen", Big Sean's "Guap", "Beware", "IDFWU" and an extensive amount of his albums including Hall of Fame, Dark Sky Paradise, and Twenty 88.

Early life 
At the age 11, Wane began playing the piano in the church every first Sunday, initially teaching himself melodies before his mom heard him and got involved in his learning. He told XXL, “She ordered me this Yamaha keyboard out of a JCPenney catalog. It got mailed to the house, and I just started making beats on it. Then I started taking piano lessons, and the stuff I learned from my piano lessons, I would combine that with beats, and it really was just something that I loved to do, man. I really didn’t go out a lot cause I was always coming up with stuff." In December 2012, Key Wane graduated from Tennessee State University with a degree in Musical Arts and Sciences.

Musical career 
In 2002, Wane started making beats in his mother's basement.  Wane met rapper Big Sean in the 8th grade through his older brother who told Wane to play beats for Sean. Big Sean was friends with Wane's older brother and cousin at their high school, Cass Technical High School in Detroit. Around the same time Wane started taking record production seriously, and begun sending him beats periodically. During mid-2010 before his junior year of college, Wane first became known after producing "Memories" by Big Sean, from his third mixtape Finally Famous Vol. 3: BIG. In 2011, Wane produced and co-wrote Tyga's "Drink the Night Away" featuring The Game and Mario, "Don't Wake Me Up" and "Hypnotized", all of which featured on his mixtape Black Thoughts Vol. 2. In November 2011, Warner/Chappell and Big Sean signed Wane to a co-publishing deal.

In early 2010, Wane produced "Amen" for Meek Mill after running into him while in New York. Meek Mill picked it up and released it as the lead single from his debut album Dreams and Nightmares. Many Christian hip hop artists and religious leaders commented negatively on the song. However the song peaked at number 57 on the Billboard Hot 100. After his significant contributions over the years, XXL named Wane one of hip-hops most must-watch producers. Wane was also included in XXL's Freshman Producer Class of 2013.

In December 2012, Wane confirmed working with Drake, Jhene Aiko, Big Sean and Beyoncé on their upcoming albums. On August 1, 2013 Drake released a song titled "All Me" produced and co-written by Wane, featuring 2 Chainz and Big Sean, from his upcoming third studio album Nothing Was the Same. He had originally produced the instrumental for himself, but after the record had sat for a couple months, Wane sent the instrumental to Drake, who immediately picked up the beat.  Along with No ID, Wane produced the majority of Big Sean's second studio album Hall of Fame (2013), including the highest-charting singles of the album, "Guap" and "Beware" featuring Jhene Aiko and Lil Wayne. He contributed production to six songs in total. Key Wane co-produced Big Sean's "IDFWU" as well. In December 2014, Wane was nominated for his first Grammy for his production contribution on the Grammy nominated  "Beyonce" for Album of the Year. In December 2015, Wane was nominated the following year at the Grammy's for his production on Jazmine Sullivan's "Let It Burn" for Best R&B Song of the Year.

Production style 
Key Wane's production has been described as "soulful instrumental music". His production is based around a melodic piano driven sound and a kickdrum.

Awards and nominations

Grammy nominations

BET Hip Hop Awards

Certifications

Discography

Production discography

Singles produced

Key Wane's production

References

1990 births
Living people
African-American pianists
African-American record producers
American hip hop record producers
Midwest hip hop musicians
Musicians from Detroit
Songwriters from Michigan
University of Tennessee alumni
Writers from Detroit
American male pianists
21st-century American pianists
21st-century American male musicians
African-American songwriters
21st-century African-American musicians
American male songwriters